Sala Consilina is a town and comune in the province of Salerno in the Campania region of southwestern Italy. With 12,635 inhabitants it is the most populated town of Vallo di Diano.

History
The ancient village of Consilinum was built during the  Roman Era.

Geography
Sala Consilina is located in the middle area of Vallo di Diano, close to the borders of Campania with Basilicata. The bordering municipalities are Atena Lucana, Brienza (PZ), Marsico Nuovo (PZ), Padula, Sassano, San Rufo and Teggiano.

People
Sala Consilina was arguably the birthplace of Giovanni Martini and the parents of Real Housewives of New Jersey star Teresa Giudice.

See also
 Cilento
 Vallo di Diano

References

External links
 
 Official website 

Cities and towns in Campania
Localities of Cilento